is a Japanese voice actress from Fukushima, Japan. She is affiliated with Axl One. In 2023, she was a recipient of the Best New Actor Award at the 17th Seiyu Awards.

Filmography

Anime

Video games

References

External links 

 Official Agency Profile 
 

21st-century Japanese actresses
Actors from Fukushima Prefecture
Japanese voice actresses
Living people
Seiyu Award winners
Year of birth missing (living people)